Mosengel is a surname. Notable people with the surname include: 

Adolf Mosengel (1837–1885), German landscape painter
Johann Josua Mosengel (1663–1731), German pipe organ builder